The 2018–19 SAFA Second Division (known as the ABC Motsepe League for sponsorship reasons) was the 21st season of the SAFA Second Division, the third tier for South African association football clubs, since its establishment in 1998. Due to the size of South Africa, the competition was split into nine divisions, one for each region. After the league stage of the regional competition was completed, the nine winning teams of each regional division entered the playoffs.

JDR Stars won the playoff after defeating Steenberg United 1-0 in the final. Both teams were promoted to the National First Division, with JDR Stars earning R1 million, and Steenberg United R500,000, in prize money.

Regions

Eastern Cape

Free State

Gauteng

Kwazulu-Natal

Limpopo

Mpumalanga

North West

Northern Cape

Stream A

Stream B

Western Cape

Playoff stage

Group A

Group B

Group C

Semi-finals

Playoff final

References 

SAFA Second Division seasons
2018–19 in South African soccer leagues